Arvind Solanki (born 10 September 1978) is an Indian cricketer. He played two List A matches between 1999 and 2002. He was also part of India's squad for the 1998 Under-19 Cricket World Cup.

References

External links
 

1978 births
Living people
Indian cricketers
Uttar Pradesh cricketers
Sportspeople from Aligarh